Sherrills Ford is an unincorporated community and former census-designated place (CDP) in Catawba County, North Carolina, United States. The population was 941 at the 2000 census. For the 2010 census it was included within the Lake Norman of Catawba CDP. It is part of the Hickory-Lenoir-Morganton Metropolitan Statistical Area.

Geography
Sherrills Ford is located at  within area code 828, ZIP code 28673, and FIPS place code 61320.

It sits at an elevation of 204 m (670 ft).

Neighboring communities include Terrell to the south and east, and Catawba to the northwest.

Schools

Catawba County Schools
 Sherrills Ford Elementary School
 Mill Creek Middle School in Catawba County
 Bandys High School in Catawba County
 Hickory High School / International Baccalaureate (IB) School in Hickory, North Carolina

Private schools
 University Christian High School located in Hickory, North Carolina
 Woodlawn School located in Iredell County
 Davidson Day School, located in Davidson, North Carolina

Charter schools
 Langtree Charter School located in Mooresville, North Carolina
 Lincoln Charter School located in Denver, North Carolina
 Pine Lake Preparatory School (Charter School) located in Mooresville, North Carolina

History
Sherrills Ford is so named due its being the site of the fording of the Catawba River from east to west by Adam Sherrill et al. ca. 1747.  (The apostrophe in "Sherrill's Ford" was inadvertently dropped.) The Sherrills, of English ancestry, had come from northeast Maryland, most probably trekking through modern Pennsylvania, West Virginia, and Virginia. Along with others, Adam Sherrill established the first settlement by people of European ancestry that far west, and his fine house was built by African American twins who were among his slaves. Many Sherrill descendants still reside in Sherrills Ford.

The Neill–Turner–Lester House and the Miles Alexander Sherrill House are listed on the National Register of Historic Places.

Demographics
As of the census of 2000, there were 941 people, 367 households, and 273 families residing in the CDP.  The population density was 121.0 people per square mile (46.7/km2).  There were 383 housing units at an average density of 49.2 per square mile (19.0/km2).  The racial makeup of the CDP was 84.5% White, 13.0% African American, 0.53% Native American, 0.11% Asian, 1.49% from other races, and 0.43% from two or more races. Hispanics or Latinos of any race were 1.49% of the population.

There were 367 households, out of which 35.7% had children under the age of 18 living with them, 62.7% were married couples living together, 8.7% had a female householder with no husband present, and 25.6% were non-families. 21.5% of all households were made up of individuals, and 8.4% had someone living alone who was 65 years of age or older.  The average household size was 2.56 and the average family size was 3.00.

In the CDP the population was spread out, with 25.7% under the age of 18, 6.6% from 18 to 24, 32.7% from 25 to 44, 22.4% from 45 to 64, and 12.5% who were 65 years of age or older.  The median age was 36 years. For every 100 females, there were 96.9 males.  For every 100 females age 18 and over, there were 98.0 males.

The median income for a household in the CDP was $41,406, and the median income for a family was $49,271. Males had a median income of $29,922 versus $30,400 for females. The per capita income for the CDP was $18,001.  About 3.7% of families and 6.5% of the population were below the poverty line, including none of those under age 18 and 23.5% of those age 65 or over.

Climate

Notable people 
The Cockman Family, bluegrass/southern gospel band
David Gilliland, NASCAR driver and owner
Todd Gilliland, NASCAR driver
Chad Little, Former NASCAR Driver and NASCAR Competition Director of the Truck Series
Jesse Little, NASCAR driver
Braun Strowman, professional wrestler and strongman

Notes

Unincorporated communities in Catawba County, North Carolina
Populated places established in 1747